is a Japanese footballer who plays as a defensive midfielder for  club Iwaki FC.

Youth career
Miyamoto started his career at Juzan FC and attended Tomioka High School. However, he spent most of his high school years playing at JFA Academy Fukushima, which moved to Gotemba, Shizuoka following the 2011 Tōhoku earthquake and tsunami.
In 2014, he made his first appearance for JFA Academy Fukushima in the Prince Takamado Cup U-18 Football League aged 16, coming on as a late substitute.
He started to get more game time in 2015, playing 12 games and starting in 5 of those. He scored his first goal for JFA Academy Fukushima in a 3–1 win over Ryutsu Keizai University.
In 2016, Miyamoto helped JFA Academy Fukushima to the quarter-finals of the Japan Club Youth Cup, where he scored in their 3–2 defeat to Vissel Kobe U-18s.

From 2017, Miyamoto represented Kokushikan University in the JUFA Kanto League. He made his debut for the university in June 2018, in a 4–0 defeat to Waseda University. He played in 15 games in his first three years before breaking out in the 2020 season – the season he was named vice-captain – by making 22 appearances in JUFA Kanto League 1. He also scored his only goal for Kokushikan in a 3–0 win over Meiji University.

Club career
In December 2020, it was announced that Miyamoto would be signing for JFL team Iwaki FC for the 2021 season. He made his debut for the team in March in a 2–1 league victory over Veertien Mie and scored his first goal in a 2–0 win over MIO Biwako Shiga. At the end of the 2021 season, Miyamoto had participated in almost all of the league games, playing in 30 out of a possible 32, helping Iwaki FC gain promotion to the J3 League.

In the 2022 season and his first in the J3 League, Miyamoto again played almost every minute, appearing in all 34 of Iwaki's league games. His J.League debut came in a 1–1 draw with Kagoshima United and his first goal in the J.League was in a 4–0 home victory over Azul Claro Numazu. He ended the season with two goals and three assists. His performances helped Iwaki to back-to-back promotions and he was rewarded with a new contract in December 2022.

Career statistics

Club

Honours

 Iwaki FC
Japan Football League : 2021
J3 League : 2022

References

External links
Profile at J.League

1998 births
Living people
Japanese footballers
Association football defenders
Association football people from Fukuoka Prefecture
Kokushikan University alumni
Iwaki FC players
J3 League players
J2 League players